

Emeroo is a locality in the Australian state of South Australia about  north of the state capital of Adelaide and about  northeast of Port Augusta in the state’s Far North region.

Emeroo is the site of a township that never developed.

As of 2012, the majority land use in the area was pastoral farming, while the land in the east of the area, which is associated with the western slope of the Flinders Ranges, includes The Dutchmans Stern Conservation Park and is zoned for conservation.

The gazetted locality of Emeroo was created in April 2013, including portions removed from the adjoining localities of Quorn and Wami Kata; the name was derived from the undeveloped township. Its western and southern boundaries approximately align with those of the cadastral unit of the County of Newcastle.  The locality extends in the west from a watercourse that extends north from and drains into Spencer Gulf to the western slopes of the Flinders Ranges in the east. The locality surrounds the top of Spencer Gulf including the ford known as Yorkey Crossing. The locality’s eastern side includes the western half of The Dutchmans Stern Conservation Park.

The Marree railway line passes through the area from south to north, while the track for both the Adelaide–Darwin railway and the Trans-Australian Railway passes through the locality's south-west.

The former Emeroo Station Ostrich Farm is listed on the South Australian Heritage Register.

Emeroo lies within the federal division of Grey, the state electoral district of Giles and the Pastoral Unincorporated Area of South Australia.<ref

References

Towns in South Australia
Places in the unincorporated areas of South Australia
Far North (South Australia)
Spencer Gulf
Flinders Ranges